Kosuke Matsuda may refer to:
Kosuke Matsuda (footballer, born 1986) (松田 康佑), Japanese footballer
Kosuke Matsuda (footballer, born 1991) (松田 康佑), Japanese footballer